Marie Joelle Wedemeyer (born 12 August 1996) is a German footballer currently under contract at Bundesliga club VfL Wolfsburg. She plays for the Germany national team.

Career

MTV Wolfenbüttel
Wedemeyer played for MTV Wolfenbüttel until 2011 and then transferred to VfL Wolfsburg youth department, whose junior team she played for in the Women’s Junior Bundesliga in its inaugural 2012/13 season. As a member of teams selected by the Lower Saxony Football Association, she took part in the national cup in 2011 (U15s), 2012 (U17s) and 2013 (U19s).

VfL Wolfsburg
Since the 2013/14 season, Wedemeyer has been a member of VfL Wolfsburg's first team squad, although she predominantly only features for the reserve team. Having made her first appearance for the first team in the second round of the German Cup against third division side TSG Burg Gretesch, she represented her country for the first time on 16 October 2013 in the second leg of the UEFA Women's Champions League Round of 32 tie against Pärnu JK.

International career
Wedemeyer made her debut for U-17 national side in a 7–0 victory over Ukraine in Brussels on 7 April 2014. With the Germany U20 team, she took part in the FIFA U-20 Women's World Cup in Canada from 5 to 24 August 2014, and came on as a substitute for Rebecca Knaak in the second half of the final against the Nigeria. Thanks to Lena Petermann's winning goal (1–0) in the 98th minute, Wedemeyer and her team became World Champions. She made her first appearance for the full national team on 10 June 2018, in a 3–2 win against the Canada in Hamilton (Ontario, Canada).

Honours
VfL Wolfsburg
 Frauen-Bundesliga (6): 2013–14, 2016–17, 2017–18, 2018–19, 2019–20, 2021–22
 DFB-Pokal Frauen (8): 2014–15, 2015–16, 2016–17, 2017–18, 2018–19, 2019–20, 2020–21, 2021–22
 UEFA Women's Champions League (1): 2013–14

Germany U20
FIFA U-20 Women's World Cup: 2014

References

External links
 
 
 
 Joelle Wedemeyer at Soccerdonna.de 

1996 births
Living people
Sportspeople from Braunschweig
Footballers from Lower Saxony
German women's footballers
Germany women's youth international footballers
Germany women's international footballers
Women's association football central defenders
VfL Wolfsburg (women) players
Frauen-Bundesliga players
2. Frauen-Bundesliga players